Tiverton is a village and former civil parish, now in the parishes of Tiverton and Tilstone Fearnall and Tarporley, in the Cheshire West and Chester district and ceremonial county of Cheshire in England. It had a population of 406 in 2001, reducing to 318 at the 2011 census. The civil parish was abolished in 2015 to form Tiverton and Tilstone Fearnall; part also went to Tarporley. The former civil parish of Tiverton and the current parish of Tiverton and Tilstone Fearnall both include the hamlet of Four Lane Ends.

See also

Listed buildings in Tiverton, Cheshire

References

External links

Villages in Cheshire
Former civil parishes in Cheshire
Cheshire West and Chester